Atopocottus is a monospecific genus of marine ray-finned fish belonging to the family Cottidae, the typical sculpins. Its only species is Atopocottus tribranchius which is found in the Sea of Japan where it is only known from the waters off of Niigata Prefecture.  This species grows to  SL.

References
 

Cottinae
Monotypic fish genera
Fish of Japan
Taxa named by Rolf Ling Bolin